Manhasset Valley Park is a park in Manhasset, on Long Island, in New York, United States. It is operated by the Town of North Hempstead.

Description 
Manhasset Valley Park is located in the valley separating the Great Neck and Cow Neck Peninsulas. It contains walking paths, a playground, and athletic fields. A stream flows through the park.  

Before the Long Island Rail Road's Port Washington Branch was extended from Great Neck to Port Washington via. the Manhasset Viaduct, the commercial heart of Manhasset was located in this area, which was nicknamed "The Valley." After the Port Washington Branch was extended to Port Washington and the Manhasset station opened on Plandome Road, the commercial center of the hamlet moved there; that area was nicknamed "The Hill."  

The park was formerly operated by Nassau County, prior to its transfer to the Town of North Hempstead. The transfer of ownership was part of an effort made by Nassau to cut costs.  

See also 

 Clark Botanic Garden – Another park located in and operated by the Town of North Hempstead.

References 

Manhasset, New York
Town of North Hempstead, New York
Parks in Nassau County, New York